Good Morning Apocalypse is the third studio album from American rock band Heaven Below. The concept album was released on October 14, 2016, through EMP Label Group and distributed by eOne Entertainment.

On September 5, 2016, the band released "Renegade Protest Movement", the first single from the record. On September 22, 2016, a music video for the song was published on YouTube. The album is a concept album.

Track listing

References

2016 albums
Concept albums
Heaven Below albums